Wilton is a town and civil parish in Wiltshire, England, with a rich heritage dating back to the Anglo-Saxons.

Carpets have been manufactured at Wilton since the 18th century. The town is home to Wilton House and has a large Romanesque parish church. The rivers Wylye and Nadder meet at Wilton.

History

The history of Wilton dates back to the Anglo-Saxons in the 8th century, and by the late 9th century it was the capital of Wiltunscire, a shire of the Kingdom of Wessex. It remained the administrative centre of Wiltshire until the 11th century. Wilton was of significant importance to the church, with the founding of Wilton Abbey in 771 amongst other establishments. In 871 Alfred the Great fought and lost an important battle here against the Danish armies, leaving him in retreat for several years.

Despite further attacks, Wilton remained a prosperous town, as recorded in the 11th-century Domesday Book. The building of Salisbury Cathedral nearby, however, caused Wilton's decline, as the new site of Salisbury, with a new bridge over the River Avon, provided a convenient bypass around Wilton on the trade routes.

Wilton Abbey was surrendered to Henry VIII in 1539 during the Dissolution of the Monasteries, and in 1541 much of the estate was granted to William Herbert, 1st Earl of Pembroke, who began to build Wilton House.

An outbreak of smallpox in 1737 killed 132 people. The Old Town Hall was completed in 1738.

On the formation of Wiltshire County Council in 1889, Wilton lost its role as county town to Trowbridge, which could be more easily reached by rail from all parts of the county.

Economy 

By the 17th century, weaving had become a busy trade, and the carpet industry began in 1741 when two French weavers were brought in by Henry Herbert, 9th Earl of Pembroke to teach the local people new skills. Carpet weaving prospered until 1815, when peace following the Napoleonic Wars introduced European competition. Machinery to produce Axminster carpets was installed in 1835. The Wilton Royal Carpet Factory was founded at the turn of the century, with the help of the then Lord Pembroke, to rescue the previous carpet factory that had fallen into financial difficulty. The factory continued to operate until 1995, when it closed temporarily after a takeover. The factory re-opened, although it was unable to retain the Wilton Royal prefix.

Transport 
Wilton once had two railway stations. The first (later known as ) was opened by the Great Western Railway in 1856 on their line from Westbury to Salisbury, and another (later known as ) was opened by the Salisbury and Yeovil Railway in 1859 on the West of England line from London Waterloo to Exeter. The arrival of the railways led to increased prosperity.

Public transport access to Wilton is now provided by several bus routes operated by Go South Coast under the Salisbury Reds brand, which ply between Salisbury and several places west of Wilton. A dedicated Park & Ride service operates from the car park between Kingsway and The Avenue, towards Salisbury city centre.

Military connections
The headquarters of Land Forces (and predecessors) was at Erskine Barracks, northeast of Wilton, from 1949 to 2010. After the headquarters moved to Marlborough Lines near Andover the site was sold for housing.

Governance
The boundaries of the modern civil parish originate with the Borough of Wilton, defined in 1885. The parish includes the villages of Bulbridge and Ditchampton. In 1894 Wilton absorbed the western part of the neighbouring parish of Fugglestone St Peter, the rest going into a new parish of Bemerton.

The parish elects a town council.  It is in the area of Wiltshire Council unitary authority, which is responsible for all significant local government functions. As of 2021, Wilton is in the 'Wilton' electoral division, which also includes nearby  Quidhampton and Netherhampton. The total division population taken at the 2011 census was 4,806.

Parish church

The Grade I listed Church of St Mary and St Nicholas was built as a replacement for St Mary's Church between 1841 and 1844 at the instigation of Catherine Herbert, Countess of Pembroke (the daughter of Semyon Vorontsov, Russian ambassador to Britain) and her younger son Sidney Herbert. It was designed by the architect Thomas Henry Wyatt in Romanesque Revival style, with considerable Byzantine influences. For a small town, the church is enormous, representing the wealth of its benefactors.

The church has a  campanile. Many of the materials used in the church's construction were imported from continental Europe, including marble columns from Italy and 12th and 13th century stained glass from France.

Bordering areas

Notable people
Dudley Cockle (1907–1986), cricketer
Edith Olivier (1872–1948), first woman mayor of Wilton, writer
Sydney Olivier (1870–1932), cricketer
 Edward Slow (1841–1925), poet and carriage builder
A. G. Street, country author, farmed at Ditchampton Farm

References

External links

 Wilton Town Council
 Historic Wilton photos at BBC Wiltshire

 
Towns in Wiltshire
Civil parishes in Wiltshire
British rugs and carpets